Isle of the Dead is a 1945 horror film directed by Mark Robson and made for RKO Radio Pictures by producer Val Lewton. The film's script was inspired by the painting Isle of the Dead by Arnold Böcklin, which appears behind the title credits, though the film was originally titled Camilla during production. It was written by frequent Lewton collaborator Ardel Wray. It starred Boris Karloff. Isle of the Dead was the second of three films Lewton made with Karloff, and the fourth of five pictures Robson directed for Lewton.

Plot 
An onscreen text warns of the superstitious belief in a vorvolaka, a malevolent force in human form. The film properly begins during the Balkan Wars of 1912. While his troops are burying their dead, General Pherides (Boris Karloff) and American reporter Oliver Davis (Marc Cramer) visit the Isle of the Dead to pay their respects to the General's long-dead wife. They discover the crypt despoiled; hearing a woman singing on the supposedly uninhabited island, they set out to find her. They also find retired Swiss archeologist Dr. Aubrecht (Jason Robards, Sr.), his Greek housekeeper Madame Kyra (Helen Thimig), British diplomat Mr. St. Aubyn (Alan Napier) and his pale and sickly wife (Katherine Emery), her youthful Greek companion Thea (Ellen Drew), and English tinsmith Andrew Robbins (Skelton Knaggs).

Aubrecht apologizes for his part 15 years before in inspiring local peasants to rob graves for valuable Greek artifacts. Kyra whispers to Pherides that a vorvolaka, in the guise of the red and rosy Thea, is in their midst. Pherides laughs at such superstition and accepts Aubrecht's invitation to spend the night as his guest.

The next morning, Robbins is dead. Dr. Drossos (Ernst Deutsch) is summoned; he determines the cause to be septicemic plague and quarantines the island. He explains how plague is passed and how it may be eradicated in one day if the hot, dry sirocco winds arrive. The archeologist says that Kyra's explanation – that God sends the plague to punish them for harboring a vorvolaka – makes just as much sense. When Mr. St. Aubyn dies, the General demands that his body be buried immediately, to the horror of the cataleptic Mrs. St. Aubyn, who fears premature burial.

Next to die is Dr. Drossos, proving that the advice of modern science does not guarantee victory over the disease. Suspicion returns to Thea, and Kyra harasses her with taunts and threats. Pherides vows that he will kill Thea if evidence appears that she is vorvolaka. Fearing for Thea's life, Oliver plans to escape with her, but Pherides destroys the only boat. Mrs. St. Aubyn falls into a cataleptic trance; everyone except Thea believes her to be dead, and they entomb her. Oliver and Aubrecht believe the cause to be plague but Kyra and Pherides believe it to be the doing of the vorvolaka. Oliver advises Thea to stay away from Pherides.

The winds change and the sirocco has arrived, but it is too late for Pherides, who exhibits symptoms of the plague. Mrs. St. Aubyn awakens from her catalepsy but has been driven insane by being buried alive. Escaping the tomb, she kills Kyra, stabs Pherides as he attempts to kill Thea, and then leaps off a cliff to her death. As Pherides is dying, he swears that he has seen the vorvolaka and warns that she must be killed. "It is done", says Dr. Aubrecht, sympathetic to Pherides' peculiar madness. "The general was simply a man who was trying to protect us", he offers as eulogy.

Cast
 Boris Karloff as Gen. Nikolas Pherides
 Ellen Drew as Thea
 Marc Cramer as Oliver Davis
 Katherine Emery as Mrs. Mary St. Aubyn
 Helene Thimig as Madame Kyra
 Alan Napier as St. Aubyn
 Jason Robards Sr. as Aubrecht
 Ernst Deutsch as Dr. Drossos
 Sherry Hall as Col. Kobestes
 Erick Hanson as Officer
 Skelton Knaggs as Andrew Robbins

Production
Filming began for about two weeks in July 1944 until production was suspended when Karloff required a back operation. It was completed in December. In the interim, after Karloff had recovered from the surgery but before the cast of Isle of the Dead could be reassembled, he and Lewton made The Body Snatcher. The film had a troubled production, and the central female character of the original script (named "Catherine") was deleted entirely from the tale.

Score

Leigh Harline's score makes use of another work inspired by Böcklin's painting, Sergei Rachmaninoff's tone poem, "Isle of the Dead". Harline borrows themes and copies their orchestration, without violating copyright. He made no use of the public-domain "Dies Irae".

Reception

Box office
The film premiered in New York City on 7 September 1945. The cost of Isle of the Dead at completion was $246,000, the highest yet for a Lewton horror film, but with domestic rentals of $266,000, and foreign rentals of $117,000, it made only $13,000 in profit for RKO. It was re-issued in 1953 on a double bill with Mighty Joe Young, and made its television debut in 1959.

Critical reception
On review aggregator website Rotten Tomatoes the film has an approval rating of 89% based on 19 reviews, with an average rating of 6.5/10.
Author and film critic Leonard Maltin awarded the film three out of a possible four stars, complimenting the film's production.
Director Martin Scorsese placed Isle of the Dead on his list of the 11 scariest horror films of all time.

See also
 Boris Karloff filmography

Notes

External links

 
 
 
 
 Review of film at Variety
 Toteninsel.net: an encyclopedia in progress dedicated to A. Böcklin's Isle of the Dead: copies, parodies, inspirations.

1945 films
1945 horror films
American horror films
American black-and-white films
Films directed by Mark Robson
Films produced by Val Lewton
Films set on islands
Films set in the Mediterranean Sea
RKO Pictures films
Works based on art
1940s American films